Butte is a potato cultivar that was released in 1977.

According to Charlie Nardozzi:

The cultivar is resistant to the lesion-causing nematode species Pratylenchus neglectus and Pratylenchus penetrans, but is susceptible to wilt disease caused by the pathogenic fungus  Verticillium dahliae.

Bibliography 

Charlie Nardozzi. Vegetable Gardening for Dummies. John Wiley, 2009.

References 

Potato cultivars